Alopecurus geniculatus is a species of grass known by the common name water foxtail or marsh foxtail.
It is native to much of Eurasia and introduced into North America, South America, and Australia. It grows in moist areas.

Alopecurus geniculatus is a perennial grass forming bunches of erect stems up to about 60 cm (24 inches) in height. The leaves are up 12 cm (5 inches) in length. The pale green to purplish  inflorescence is a dense panicle up to 6 or 7 cm long which blooms in dusty yellow-orange anthers. reproduces sexually by seeds and can reproduce vegetatively by rooting at stem nodes.

Environmental conservation

Alopecurus geniculatus is a component of purple moor grass and rush pastures  a type of Biodiversity Action Plan habitat in the UK. It occurs on poorly drained neutral and acidic soils of the lowlands and upland fringe.

Nonindigenous spread 
The grass has spread significantly in the United States since it was first introduced.

Hybrid 
Alopecurus geniculatus is known to hybridize with other members of the Alopecurus genus. Alopecurus x haussknechtianus is a hybrid between A. geniculatus and A. aequalis, Alopecurus x brachystylus is a hybrid between A. geniculatus and A. pratensis, Alopecurus x plettkei is s hybrid between A. geniculatus and A. bulbosus (Botanical Society of Britain and Ireland 2016)

References

External links
Jepson Manual Treatment
United States Department of Agriculture Plants Profile
Grass Manual Treatment
Calphotos Photo gallery, University of California

geniculatus
Bunchgrasses of Asia
Bunchgrasses of Europe
Plants described in 1753
Taxa named by Carl Linnaeus